Bascom Joseph Rowlett (1886–1947) was an architect in Richmond, Virginia. He was raised by others after his father, James Bascom Rowlett, who worked at the Tredegar Ironworks died. Rowlett graduated from Richmond High School in 1906 and Virginia Mechanics Institute (a Mechanics' Institutes).

Career
Rowlett worked for Albert Huntt. After Huntt's death, Rowlett worked as a solo practitioner. Business was hit by the Great Depression and Rowlett took on federal government projects including the Warren County Courthouse in Front Royal for the WPA. Rowlett died in 1947 and was buried in Orange, Virginia. His son Bascom Rowlett Jr. attended Virginia Tech and became an engineer.

Works
 Westhaven Apartments on the Boulevard
 Cannon apartment house at 1110 Grove Avenue  (1922) Mediterranean architecture
 Rixey Court on Monument Avenue (1924)
 English Village (1926) Tudor Revival architecture style
 Tuscan Villa between Park and Kensington on the Boulevard
 Kensington Avenue apartment houses
Apartment Houses at 111, 218-220, 103 South Boulevard, 2832 Monument Avenue and 3010-12 Monument

References

1886 births
1947 deaths
20th-century American architects
Architects from Richmond, Virginia